Padovo pri Fari (in older sources also Padova) is a small settlement in the hills above the left bank of the Kolpa River in the Municipality of Kostel in southern Slovenia. The area is part of the traditional region of Lower Carniola and is now included in the Southeast Slovenia Statistical Region.

Name
The name of the settlement was changed from Padovo to Padovo pri Fari in 1953. In the past the German name was Padua.

References

External links
Padovo pri Fari on Geopedia

Populated places in the Municipality of Kostel